The year 2022 is the 12th year in the history of the Fight Nights, a mixed martial arts promotion based in Russia. The company continues broadcasts through Match TV and Fight Network.

List of events

AMC Fight Nights 108

'AMC Fight Nights 108' was a mixed martial arts event held by AMC Fight Nights January 28, 2022 at the Crocus Expo, Aquarium Arena in Krasnogorsk, Russia.

Background
The event was headlined by a middleweight bout between kickboxer Alexander Stetsurenko and  fistfighter Timur Nikulin, while the co-main event was a heavyweight contest between Grigory Ponomarev and the former KSW Heavyweight Champion Fernando Rodrigues Jr.

Results

AMC Fight Nights 109

'AMC Fight Nights 109' was a mixed martial arts event held by AMC Fight Nights February 23, 2022 at the Red Arena in Sochi, Russia.

Background
An AMC Fight Nights Featherweight Championship bout between the reigning champion Mukhamed Eminov and Taigro Costa was scheduled for the event.

An AMC Fight Nights Flyweight Championship bout for the vacant title between Vartan Asatryan and Vladimir Alekseev was scheduled for the event.

Results

AMC Fight Nights 110

'AMC Fight Nights 110' was a mixed martial arts event held by AMC Fight Nights March 25, 2022 at the  SZK Zvozdnyy in Astrakhan, Russia.

Background
An AMC Fight Nights Heavyweight Championship bout for the vacant title between Grigoriy Ponomarev and Yusup Shuaev was scheduled as the event headliner.

Results

AMC Fight Nights 111

'AMC Fight Nights 111: Kovalev vs. Santos' was a mixed martial arts event held by AMC Fight Nights on May 6, 2022 at the Fetisov Arena in Vladivostok, Russia.

Background

Results

AMC Fight Nights 112

'AMC Fight Nights 112: Abbasov vs Piraev' was a mixed martial arts event held by AMC Fight Nights on June 10, 2022 at the Irina Viner-Usmanova Gymnastics Palace in Moscow, Russia.

Background

Results

AMC Fight Nights 113

'AMC Fight Nights 113: Vagabov vs Barkhudaryan' was a mixed martial arts event held by AMC Fight Nights on July 15, 2022 at the Basket-Hall Krasnodar in Krasnodar, Russia.

Background

Results

AMC Fight Nights 114

'AMC Fight Nights 114: Romankevich vs. Zuluzinho' was a mixed martial arts event held by AMC Fight Nights on September 3, 2022 at the Stadium Dinamo in Minsk, Belarus.

Background

Results

AMC Fight Nights 115

'AMC Fight Nights 115' was a mixed martial arts event held by AMC Fight Nights on October 14, 2022 at the Red Arena in Sochi, Russia.

Background

Results

AMC Fight Nights 116

'AMC Fight Nights 116' was a mixed martial arts event held by AMC Fight Nights on November 11, 2022 in Astrakhan, Russia.

Background

Results

See also
 2022 in UFC
 2022 in Bellator MMA
 2022 in ONE Championship
 2022 in Absolute Championship Akhmat
 2022 in Konfrontacja Sztuk Walki
 2022 in Rizin Fighting Federation
 2022 in Brave Combat Federation
 2022 in Road FC
 2022 Professional Fighters League season
 2022 in Eagle Fighting Championship
 2022 in Legacy Fighting Alliance

References

Fight Nights Global events
2022 in mixed martial arts
AMC Fight Nights
2022 sport-related lists